The Original New Orleans Jazz Band was one of the first jazz bands to make recordings.  Composed of mostly New Orleans musicians, the band was popular in New York City in the late 1910s.

The group included some of the first New Orleans style players to follow the Original Dixieland Jass Band's success playing in Manhattan. Like the "ODJB", most were veterans of Papa Jack Laine's groups in New Orleans. Recordings of the group were issued by Gennett Records and Okeh Records. The group also reportedly recorded one or more sides for Emerson Records, which seem to have never been issued.

Jimmy Durante, the only New Yorker in the group, became well known for his showmanship and took over leadership from Frank Christian in 1920 and the group was renamed "Jimmy Durante's Jazz Band".

Collective personnel

The band was usually a five piece group, but some musicians came and went. The precise personnel on some of the recordings is uncertain. Members of the band included:

 Frank Christian, cornet
 Alfred Laine, cornet
 Harry Gluck, cornet
 Frank Lhotak, trombone
 Jeff Loyacano, trombone
 Achille Baquet, clarinet
 Jimmy Durante, piano
 Johnny Stein, drums
 Deacon Loyacano, drums

References

External links
 Original New Orleans Jazz Band at the Red Hot Jazz Archive

Jazz musicians from New Orleans
Dixieland ensembles
American jazz ensembles from New Orleans
Musical groups from New Orleans
Gennett Records artists